Turakina is an old Māori settlement situated southeast of Whanganui city on the North Island of New Zealand. Turakina village derives its name from the Turakina River, which cut its passage to the sea from a  source south of Waiouru.

Turakina is notable as the site of the first of New Zealand's children's health camp, established by Elizabeth Gunn in November 1919.

History and culture

Pre-European history
The original inhabitants of the area were the descendants of the Kahui Rere and the Kahui Maunga, later naming themselves Ngā Wairiki. However, after the migration of Ngāti Apa from the Bay of Plenty toward Rotoaira then south to the Rangitikei river, they found themselves slowly being taken over by generations of intermarriage with the latter tribe.

The hapū of Ngā Āriki still live in Turakina.

European settlement
Scottish settlers arrived in the area in the 19th century, and their descendants still live there to the present day. Many Māori families intermarried with the Scottish also.

Celtic feeling is still strong in Turakina. For example, Highland games are held every year late January, attracting many from around New Zealand.

Marae
The local Tini Waitara Marae and Te Horo Taraipi meeting house is a traditional meeting place of Ngāti Apa.

Demographics

It had a population of 1,254 at the 2018 New Zealand census, an increase of 18 people (1.5%) since the 2013 census, and a decrease of 6 people (-0.5%) since the 2006 census. There were 435 households. There were 636 males and 618 females, giving a sex ratio of 1.03 males per female. The median age was 41.9 years (compared with 37.4 years nationally), with 264 people (21.1%) aged under 15 years, 231 (18.4%) aged 15 to 29, 573 (45.7%) aged 30 to 64, and 186 (14.8%) aged 65 or older.

Ethnicities were 67.7% European/Pākehā, 39.7% Māori, 2.4% Pacific peoples, 1.2% Asian, and 1.0% other ethnicities (totals add to more than 100% since people could identify with multiple ethnicities).

The proportion of people born overseas was 6.9%, compared with 27.1% nationally.

Although some people objected to giving their religion, 33.7% had no religion, 30.6% were Christian, 0.2% were Muslim, 0.2% were Buddhist and 29.4% had other religions.

Of those at least 15 years old, 126 (12.7%) people had a bachelor or higher degree, and 237 (23.9%) people had no formal qualifications. The median income was $28,300, compared with $31,800 nationally. The employment status of those at least 15 was that 501 (50.6%) people were employed full-time, 150 (15.2%) were part-time, and 57 (5.8%) were unemployed.

Education

References

Populated places in Manawatū-Whanganui